Dasymaschalon is an Asian genus of bushy plants in the subfamily Annonoideae and tribe Uvarieae.  Its native range is from southern China, Indo-China to Malesia (west of the Wallace line).

Morphology

FIGURE 1. Floral morphology in the Dasymaschalon alliance. (A) Monanthotaxis buchananii, showing loosely coherent pollination chamber. (B) Desmos chinensis, with partially closed chamber formed by petals that are basally constricted. (C) Friesodielsia desmoides, with outer petals free spreading, inner petals apically connivent forming a closed pollination chamber. (D) Dasymaschalon dasymaschalum, with three outer petals apically connivent forming a closed pollination chamber. (E) Floral diagram of Friesodielsia. (F) Floral diagram of Dasymaschalon. Colors are used to differentiate floral organs; blue, sepal; green, outer petal; purple, inner petal; gray, stamen; pink, carpel. The ranks and total numbers of stamens and carpels are artificial in (E,F), with six/three lines of stamens and carpels shown at the corners of the hexagonal/triangular floral meristem.

Species 
Plants of the World Online currently includes:

 Dasymaschalon acuminatum Jing Wang & R.M.K.Saunders
 Dasymaschalon angustifolium Jing Wang & R.M.K.Saunders
 Dasymaschalon bachmaensis N.S.Lý, T.H.Lê, Vuong & N.D.Do
 Dasymaschalon borneense Nurmawati
 Dasymaschalon clusiflorum (Merr.) Merr.
 Dasymaschalon dasymaschalum (Blume) I.M.Turner - type species
 Dasymaschalon echinatum Jing Wang & R.M.K.Saunders
 Dasymaschalon ellipticum Nurmawati
 Dasymaschalon evrardii Ast
 Dasymaschalon filipes (Ridl.) Bân
 Dasymaschalon glaucum Merr. & Chun
 Dasymaschalon grandiflorum Jing Wang, Chalermglin & R.M.K.Saunders
 Dasymaschalon hirsutum Nurmawati
 Dasymaschalon lomentaceum Finet & Gagnep.
 Dasymaschalon longiflorum (Roxb.) Finet & Gagnep.
 Dasymaschalon longiusculum (Bân) Jing Wang & R.M.K.Saunders
 Dasymaschalon macrocalyx Finet & Gagnep.
 Dasymaschalon megalanthum (Merr.) Jing Wang & R.M.K.Saunders
 Dasymaschalon minutiflorum (Nurmawati) Jing Wang & R.M.K.Saunders
 Dasymaschalon robinsonii Ast
 Dasymaschalon rostratum Merr. & Chun
 Dasymaschalon sootepense Craib
 Dasymaschalon tibetense X.L.Hou
 Dasymaschalon trichophorum Merr.
 Dasymaschalon tueanum Bân
 Dasymaschalon wallichii (Hook.f. & Thomson) Jing Wang & R.M.K.Saunders
 Dasymaschalon yunnanense (Hu) Bân

References

External links 
 
 

Annonaceae genera